The Electorate of Trier ( or  or Trèves) was an ecclesiastical principality of the Holy Roman Empire that existed from the end of the 9th to the early 19th century. It was the temporal possession of the prince-archbishop of Trier who was, ex officio, a prince-elector of the empire. The other ecclesiastical electors were the electors of Cologne and Mainz.

The capital of the electorate was Trier; from the 16th century onward, the main residence of the Elector was in Koblenz. The electorate was secularized in 1803 in the course of the German mediatisation.

The Elector of Trier, in his capacity as archbishop, also administered the Archdiocese of Trier, whose territory did not correspond to the electorate (see map below).

History

Middle ages
It was raised to archiepiscopal status during the reign of Charlemagne, whose will mentions the bishoprics of Metz, Toul and Verdun as its suffragans.

The bishops of Trier were already virtually independent territorial magnates during the Merovingian dynasty. In 772, Charlemagne granted Bishop Wiomad complete immunity from the jurisdiction of the ruling count for all the churches and monasteries, as well as villages and castles that belonged to the Church of St. Peter at Trier. In 816 Louis the Pious confirmed to Archbishop Hetto the privileges of protection and immunity granted by his father.

At the partition of the Carolingian empire at Verdun in 843, Trier was given to Lothair; at the partition of Lotharingia at Mersen in 870, it became part of the East Frankish kingdom, which developed into the Kingdom of Germany.

In 898, Archbishop Radbod received complete immunity from all taxes for the entire episcopal territory, granted by Zwentibold, who was the natural son of Emperor Arnulf of Carinthia, and who reigned briefly as King of Lotharingia. He was under great pressure from his independent nobles and desperately needed a powerful ally. The gift cemented the position of the archbishops as territorial lords in their own right. Following Zwentibold's assassination in 900, the handlers of the child-king Louis courted Radbod in their turn, granting him the district and city of Trier outright, permission to impose customs duties and the right to a mint (as much a symbol of independent authority as an economic tool). From the court of Charles the Simple, he obtained the final right of election of the Bishop of Trier by the chapter, free of Imperial interference.

Early modern
In early modern times, the Electorate of Trier still encompassed territory along the river Moselle between Trier, near the French border, and Koblenz on the Rhine.  From the early 13th century the Archbishop of Trier, as the holder of an imperial office was traditionally an Imperial Elector of the German king. The purely honorary office of Arch-chancellor of Gaul arose in the 13th century. In this context, that was taken to mean the Kingdom of Burgundy-Arles, technically from 1242 and permanently from 1263, and nominally until 1803. Arles along with Germany and the medieval Kingdom of Italy was one of the three component kingdoms of the Holy Roman Empire.

In 1473, Emperor Frederick III and Charles the Bold, Duke of Burgundy held a meeting in Trier. In this same year, the University of Trier was founded in the city. Between 1581 and 1593, the Trier witch trials gravely affected the entire territory; it was one of the first mass witch trials of the Holy Roman Empire, and resulted in the death of hundreds of people. 

During the Thirty Years' War, Archbishop-Elector Philipp Christoph von Sötern supported France against the Habsburgs, leading to a rivalry between French and Spanish troops about the strategic cities and fortresses of the Electorate. In 1630, the city of Trier opened its gates to Spanish troops to defend its rights against the absolutist Elector. French troops captured the city in 1632 to help Sötern. In return, they were allowed to install garrisons there and in the fortress of Ehrenbreitstein. Spanish troops retook Trier by surprise in 1635 and imprisoned Sötern. During his absence, the cathedral chapter took over administration of the archbishopric. Imperial troops dispelled the French garrison of Ehrenbreitstein in 1637 and occupied the place until the end of the war. The archbishop was released from captivity in 1645 because of French demands in Westphalia.

The warfare returned to the Electorate in 1673 when the French Army occupied Trier and stayed until 1675. They heavily fortified the city and destroyed all churches, abbeys and settlements in front of the city walls.

In 1684, with the War of the Reunions, an era of French expansion began. Trier was again captured in 1684; all walls and fortresses were destroyed this time. After Trier and its associated electorate were yet again taken during the War of Palatinate Succession in 1688, many cities in the electorate were systematically destroyed in 1689 by the French Army. Nearly all castles were blown up and the only bridge across the Moselle in Trier was burnt. King Louis XIV of France personally issued the order for these acts of destruction. As the French Army retreated in 1698, it left a starving city without walls and only 2,500 inhabitants.

During the War of the Spanish Succession in 1702, Trier was occupied again by a French army. In 1704–05, an allied Anglo-Dutch army commanded by the Duke of Marlborough passed Trier on its way to France. When the campaign failed, the French came back to Trier in 1705 and stayed until 1714. After a short period of peace, the War of the Polish Succession started in 1734; the following year Trier was again occupied by the French, who stayed until 1737. The last Prince-Elector, Clement Wenceslaus of Saxony, relocated to Koblenz in 1786. In August 1794, French Republican troops took Trier. This date marked the end of the era of the old electorate. Churches, abbeys and clerical possessions were sold or the buildings put to secular use, such as stables.

The last elector, Clemens Wenceslaus, resided exclusively in Koblenz after 1786. From 1795, the territories of the Electorate on the left bank of the Rhine were under French occupation; in 1801, they were annexed and a separate French-controlled diocese established under Bishop Charles Mannay. In 1803, the French diocese assumed control of the whole diocese and what was left of the electoral territory on the eastern bank of the Rhine was secularized and annexed by Nassau-Weilburg in 1803.

Archbishop-Electors of Trier

John I 1189–1212
Theodoric II (Dietrich von Wied) 1212–42
Arnold II von Isenburg 1242–59
Heinrich I von Finstingen 1260–86
Bohemond I von Warnesberg 1286–99
Diether von Nassau 1300–07
Heinrich II von Virneburg 1300–06 (in opposition)
Baldwin von Luxemburg 1307–54
Bohemond II von Saarbrücken 1354–61
Kuno II von Falkenstein 1362–88
Werner von Falkenstein 1388–1417
Lenihan von Weideburg 1417–1419
Otto von Ziegenhain 1419–30
Rhaban von Helmstadt 1430–38
Jakob von Sierk 1439–56
Johann II of Baden 1456–1503
Jakob von Baden 1503–11
Richard von Greiffenklau zu Vollrads 1511–31
Johann von Metzenhausen 1531–40
Johann Ludwig von Hagen 1540–47
John of Isenburg-Grenzau 1547–56
Johann von der Leyen 1556–67
Jakob von Eltz-Rübenach 1567–81
Johann von Schönenberg 1581–99
Lothar von Metternich 1599–1623
Philipp Christoph von Sötern 1623–52
Karl Kaspar von der Leyen-Hohengeroldseck 1652–76
Johann Hugo von Orsbeck 1676–1711
Charles Joseph of Lorraine 1711–15
Franz Ludwig of Palatinate-Neuburg 1716–29
Franz Georg von Schönborn-Buchheim 1729–56
Johann IX Philipp von Walderdorff 1756–68
Prince Clemens Wenceslaus of Saxony 1768–1803

Footnotes

898 establishments
1801 disestablishments in the Holy Roman Empire
States and territories established in the 890s
Electorate
Electoral Rhenish Circle
Former states and territories of Rhineland-Palatinate
History of the Rhineland
 
Electorates of the Holy Roman Empire
Prince-bishoprics of the Holy Roman Empire in France
Former monarchies of Europe
Former theocracies